Ghosts are an important and integral part of the folklore of the socio-cultural fabric of the geographical and ethno-linguistic region of Bengal which presently consists of Bangladesh and the Indian state of West Bengal. Fairy tales, both old and new, often use the concept of ghosts. References to ghosts are often found in modern-day Bengali literature, cinema, radio and television media. There are also many alleged haunted sites in the region. The common word for ghosts in Bengali is bhoot or bhut. This word has an alternative meaning: 'past' in Bengali. Also, the word Pret (derived from Sanskrit 'Preta') is used in Bengali to mean ghost. In Bengal, ghosts are believed to be the unsatisfied spirits of human beings who cannot find peace after death or the souls of people who died in unnatural or abnormal circumstances like murders, suicides or accidents. Non-human animals can also turn into ghosts after their death. But they are often associated with good luck and wealth in Bangladesh.

Types of ghosts and other supernatural entities 

There are many kinds of ghosts and similar supernatural entities that frequently come up in Bengali culture and folklore. Ghosts have been important in the socio-cultural beliefs, superstitions and popular entertainment of the Bengali people.  A few such supernatural entities are mentioned here.

  Shakchunni: The word Shakchunni comes from the Sanskrit word Shankhachurni. It is (usually) a ghost of a married woman who usually wears a special kind of traditional bangles made of shell (called ‘Shankha’ in Bengali) in their hands, which is a sign of married Hindu women in Bengal. In Bangladesh (and sometimes India), Shakchunnis are different from Petnis and are believed to be living in trees and attack people who disturb them, they are considered as unbeatable and the only way of getting rid of them is by calling a Imam or Pandit who get rid of them by a variety of different shamanistic rituals.

  Petni: Petni are female ghosts who died unmarried or have some unsatisfied desires. The word Petni originated from the Sanskrit word Pretni (feminine gender of Preta).
 Damori: Tantric practices and black magic have been very popular in rural Bengal in the past for many centuries. Some rural people from Bengal, obsessed with the occult, used to travel to Kamrup-Kamakhya in Assam in order to learn Tantric ways and black magic. Many Sadhu (Ascetic Yogis), Tantric, Aghori, Kapalik and Kabiraj devoted their lives in pursuit of occult practices. Such people are said to have the power to invoke lower-level demonic/ ghostly entities such as Hakini, Shakhini (same as Shakchunni) and Dakini. Tantriks use these demonic spirits for soothsaying purposes, and also for causing harm to people. When superstitious rural people wanted to cause harm to an enemy, they went to the Tantriks to seek their help. A common practice was called "Baan Mara", a ritual by which the Tantriks used demonic forces to kill a person. In such cases, the victim is said to die by vomiting blood up their throat. The two most higher-level tantric mantra are Kularnob and Moha Damor. A tantrik mantra called Bhoot Damor (a lower-level branch of Moha Damor) works with different demi-goddesses called Jogini, Jokkhini, Kinnori, Apshori, Bhutini, etc. Altogether these bunch of supernatural entities are called Damori. In Tantrik philosophy, it is believed If someone can engulf himself into ascetic pursuit and worship through Bhoot Damor, the invoked Damori will appear to that person, will associate with him, and becomes somewhat under his control.  These beings are neither human nor incorporeal, but somewhere in-between. They are from some unseen realm, and can materialize in our perceived physical dimension. Their concept is similar to the western concept of Fairies or Elves; or the Islamic/Persian concept of Pori / Pari.
 Besho Bhoot: The word Besho comes from the word Baash which means 'Bamboo' in Bengali. Besho Bhoot are ghosts that live in bamboo gardens. People from rural Bengal believe that harmful ghosts live in bamboo gardens, and one should not walk pass these areas after dusk. It is said that when a bamboo leans or lays in the ground, no one should cross over it and should go around it. This is because when someone makes an attempt to cross the bamboo, the bamboo is pulled back straight up by an unseen force, and the person can die as a result. It is also reported that a gusty wind blows inside the bamboo garden while the weather is calm on the outside.
 Penchapechi: An unusual form of ghost. The Penchapechi take the form of an owl and haunt in the forests of Bengal. It follows helpless travelers through the woods until they are completely alone, and then it strikes. Unlike other ghosts, the Penchapechi actually consumes its victims, feeding on their body in an almost vampiric way.
 Aili/Gaili: Ailis are a supernatural entity that mislead people to the wrong path often leading to a river or lake through hallucination and then make them drown. Belief in them is largely in the Rural areas of Bangladesh.
 Mechho Bhoot: This is a kind of ghost who likes to eat fish. The word Mechho comes from Machh that means 'fish' in Bengali. Mechho Bhoot usually lives near to the village ponds or lakes which are full of fish.  These kinds of ghosts urge the late night fishermen or a lone person who carries fish with him to give them their fish by saying in a nasal tone - "Machh Diye Ja" (meaning "give me the fish"). If the person refuses to leave the fish for the Mechho Bhoot, it threatens to harm them. Sometimes they steal fish from kitchens in village households or from the boats of fishermen.
 Mamdo Bhoot: These are believed to be the ghosts of Muslims. Ghosts of such kind are believed to kill people by twisting their necks.
 Gechho Bhoot: It is a kind of ghost that lives in trees. The word Gechho comes from the word Gaachh, which means tree in Bengali.
 Aleya / Atoshi Bhoot: Atoshi (or marsh ghost-light) is the name given to an unexplained strange light phenomena occurring over the marshes as observed by Bengalis, especially the fishermen of West Bengal and Bangladesh. This marsh light (Will-o'-the-wisp) often look like a flying, glowing orb of fire. These confuse the fishermen, and is said to lure them out and then drown them into the very depths of water, never to rise again. Like Nishi, their voice is also said to be irresistible. Local communities in the region believe that these are the ghosts of fisherman who died fishing. The fishermen of Sundarban delta region, especially the Khasti and Manna fishermen communities, strongly believe in these and always do an 'Atoshi-taron ritual before they go out for fishing.
 Begho Bhoot: The word Begho comes from the Bengali word Baagh meaning 'tiger'. Begho Bhoot are ghosts of the people who were killed or eaten by the tigers in Sundarbans, which is known to be the Royal Bengal Tiger Sanctuary of the Bengal region. The villagers living in the area believe in these kinds of ghosts. These entities are said to frighten people who enters the jungle in search of honey or woods, and try to bring them to face the tigers. Sometimes they do the mimicry of tigers to terrify the villagers.
 Skondhokata / Kondhokata: It is a headless ghost. These are believed to be the spirit of those people who died by having their heads cutoff by train accident or by some other way. This kind of ghost always searches their missing heads, and pleads others to help them to find it. Sometimes they attack the humans and make them slaves to search for their lost heads.
 Kanabhulo: This is a ghost which hypnotize a person, and takes him to some unknown location. The victim, instead of going into his destination, goes to another place which is silent and eerie. After that the victim loses his sense. These types of ghosts strike at night. Lone travellers, or a person separated from his group becomes the victim of such ghosts.
Prapti: The word Prapti is a Sanskrit one meaning 'to get something'. These are said to be ghosts of girls who had more than one lover, and suffered from indecision. These girls therefore committed suicide, thus 'getting freedom' from all the conflict. It is said that after the girl dies, her lovers also commit suicide to be with her, or the Prapti haunts them and drives them to insanity until they do so. But the irony is that after the lovers die, they still do not get the girl, who escapes after taking her revenge. Therefore, the ghosts of the lovers get stuck forever, searching for their love.
 Dainee:  Dainee means "Witch". Dainee is not actually soul or spirit, rather, is a  living being. Usually in the villages of Bengal, old suspicious women who know mumbo-jumbo and other witchcrafts or black magic are considered as Dainee. It is believed that the Dainee kidnaps children, kills them and suck their blood to survive a hundred years.

 Brahmodaittyo: These are one of the most popular kind of ghost in Bengal who are believed to be benevolent. It is believed to be the ghost of holy Brahmin. Usually, they appear wearing a traditional dhoti and the sacred thread on their body. They are very kind and helpful to the living as depicted in many Bengali stories, folk-lores and movies.
 Boba: This is the Bengali version of the "Old Hag Syndrome" which is believed to be caused by a supernatural entity called "Boba" (meaning "dumb"/unable to speak). Boba attacks a person by strangling him when the person sleeps in a Supine position/ sleep on back. However, the scientific explanation is believed to be Sleep Paralysis. While a person is having sleep paralysis, he hallucinates in his REM sleep while the brain is functioning but the body is asleep. This actually causes the person to completely unable to move or speak, and results in to hallucinate weird entities such as an old hag (a witch-like demonic being). In Bangladesh, the phenomenon is called "Bobaay Dhora" (meaning "Struck by Boba").
 Sheekol Buri / Jol-Pishach: They are believed to dwell in the rivers, ponds, and lakes. They are called by different names in different localities of Bengal. Young women, who either committed suicide by drowning due to an unhappy marriage (they might have been jilted by their lovers or abused and harassed by their much older husbands), or who were violently drowned against their will (especially after becoming pregnant with unwanted children), must live out their designated time on earth and come back as such beings.  Her main purpose is, however, to lure young men, and take them into the depths of said waterways where she would entangle their feet with her long hair and submerge them. Their hair is very long and always wet, and their eyes are without any iris. Like many fairies, they sometimes do take human lovers. Unfortunately, most of such unions end tragically for the human. As is usually the case, they extract a promise from her mortal lover and when such promise is broken, she reveals herself to be the supernatural creature she is, often taking the life of the human in the process. Their general habitat is water bodies, even though they roam around the land/wilderness around the water and are also often seen sitting over trees in the dead of night. The concept of such supernatural beings is similar to that of Rusalka from Slavic mythology.
 Nishi: The Nishi (Night Spirit) lures its victim to a secluded area by calling to the person with the voice of a loved one. The Nishi only strikes at night, and once the victim responds to the call of Nishi, s/he becomes hypnotised, follow the voice, and are never seen again. So, it is unknown what happens to them. Some tantrics are said to nurture and conjure the Nishi, in order to use them to harm someone out of spite or revenge. The voice of Nishi (means 'Night') is known as "Nishir Daak" (Call of the Night Spirit). Bengali age old superstition suggests that Sleepwalking phenomenon is also caused by Nishi. According to folklore, the Nishi cannot call out more than twice, and so no one should answer a voice at night  being called at least three times.
 Gudro Bonga: Even though these as worshipped as demigods by the Santhal community (an indigenous tribe in Bengal), many Santhal families are said to nurture and look after these small dwarf-like (2–3 feet tall) creatures who look like small children. The word Gudro means 'small' and Bonga means 'demigod' in Santhal language. Santhals believe that these beings are keepers of hidden treasures on earth and can make them rich. These beings are believed to steal newborn infants from people's houses. Gudro Bongas are believed to live in clans. They are similar to the concept of Dwarfs or Goblins.
 Dhan Kudra: Experiences with such of entities are found in the myths of Bengal(specially south Bengal). They usually are short in height. It is a belief that they stay in somebody's house and they help the house-owner to make money. They are believed to bring luck. They are possibly similar to Domovoi's of Russian folklores.
 Rakkhosh: A race of beings often depicted with thick pointed fangs, sharp claws, and superhuman strength, and magical abilities. They feature in the Hindu epics of Ramayana and Mahabharata. Many fairy-tale of Bengal also speak of this race, typically as vicious beings who feed on humans and large animals. A common threatening call of the rakkhosh in traditional Bengali folk-tales is this couplet: Hnau, Mnau, Khnau,... manusher gondho pnau(Bengali:হাঁউ মাঁউ খাঁউ,... মানুষের গন্ধ পাঁউ) The first three are half-nonsensical words suggesting an opening of the mouth and an intention to devour), and the second phrase means "I smell humans". This is comparable to "fi fie foe...", the catchphrase associated with giants in some folklore.
Khokkosh: They are smaller monstrous beings, similar to the rakkhosh, but not found in Hindu myths. They feature in "Lalkamal Neelkamal", a story in the Thakurmar Jhuli.
Daittyo: They have human appearance, but of prodigious size and extraordinary strength. Same as Giants.
Pishach / Adomkhor: Pishach are flesh-eating demonic entity who mainly feed from cadavers. They like darkness and traditionally depicted to haunt cremation grounds and graveyards. They have the power to assume different forms at will, and may also become invisible. Sometimes, they possess human beings and alter their thoughts, and the victims are afflicted with a variety of maladies and abnormalities like insanity. The female version of Pishach is called "Pishachini", which is described to have a hideous and terrible appearance, however she sometimes appears in the devious disguise of a youthful, beautiful maiden to lure young men. She drains their blood, semen, and virility. She dwells and prowls in places associated with death and filth. They are similar to the western concept of ghouls.
 Betaal: Betaal are defined as spirits inhabiting cadavers and charnel grounds. These evil spirits may use corpses as vehicles for movement (as they no longer decay while so inhabited); but a Betaal may also leave the corpse at will.
 Jokkho / Jokkh: A supernatural warrior-type entity who are the guardians and protectors of hidden treasures/wealth on earth. They are usually considered to be benevolent, and said to bestow fertility and wealth upon their devotees. There is a commonly used Bengali idiom - Jokkher Dhon (literal meaning: Jokkho's Wealth) which actually implies "protecting a beloved person" or "safeguarding precious wealth".

 Jinn / Djinn: The Muslim community of Bengal strongly believe that any supernatural/ghostly/demonic/paranormal occurrence, phenomenon and manifestation is the work of Jinn. Jinns can be both benevolent or malevolent. Malevolent Jinns (Demon) can be really evil, and can cause haunting in human residences, empty houses, toilets, lakes, graveyards, morgues, hospitals, and in the wilderness. Some people are also believed to conjure Jinns, and use them to fulfil their evil purposes. When a Jinn is in the vicinity, a person might experience a strange perfume/flowery smell or terrible odour of rotten flesh, or burning odour even though no possible source of those smell/odour can be found. Jinns have no physical body of their own, and are creatures from an unseen dimension/realm. Jinns are shape-shifters, and often take the form of a human or animal (commonly snake, dog, cat, crow, or bull). When Jinn attaches itself to a living person, people call it jinn/demonic possession. Jinns are exorcised by pious people like Imam or Mawlana by reciting chapters from the Quran. Professional village exorcists/ witch-doctors called Kabiraj / Ojha commands/forces the Jinn to leave the possessed person by exorcism rituals which includes the use of talismans/ Ta'wiz/Tabiz, or by conjuring a good Jinn to counteract the forces of the possessing evil Jinn. Jinns have the ability to predict the future, can read people's thoughts, have extraordinary strength and powers; a person possessed by a Jinn can also demonstrate such abilities. However, Jinns are dimwitted, foolhardy, aggressive, angry, and deceive humans with their lies. There are also good and wise jinns who are believed to be pious and save/help human from dangerous/fatal situations.  Jinns are believed to eat raw fish/meat/bones and are fond of traditional Bengali sweets. The sweet salespeople in Bangladesh strongly affirm the idea that Jinns come to the sweet shops at late night in human form to buy sweets. Jinns live in clans, and every clan is headed by a King Jinn. There are several distinct classes of Jinn, such as Marid, Ifreet and Ghul (Ghoul) and Qareen.

In festivals

Bhoot Chaturdashi

The 14th day of the Krishna Paksha (waning phase of the moon) which is also the night before Kali Puja and the second day of Dipaboli is celebrated as Bhoot Chaturdashi (translation, the fourteenth of ghosts) by Bengali Hindus. On this night, 14 earthen-lamps (choddo prodip) are lit at homes to appease the spirits of the past 14 generations of ancestors. It is believed that on the night before Kali Puja, the spirits of these ancestors descend upon the earth, and these lamps help them find their way home. Another popular belief is that Chamunda (a fearsome aspect of Kali) along with 14 other ghostly forms ward off the evil spirits from the house as 14 earthen-lamps are lit at different entrances and in the dark corners of the rooms. It is customary to consume a dish of 14 types of leafy vegetables (choddo shaak) during Bhoot Chaturdashi so that evil spirits are unable to possess the body.

Alleged haunted places

Bangladesh 

According to legend, Lalbagh Fort, Golf Heights Banani, Airport Road, Uttara Sector-3 in Dhaka; Chalan Beel in Sirajganj, Foy's Lake, Pakri Beach, Mirsarai Highway Crossing in Chittagong and many other places in Bangladesh are claimed to be haunted.

 Dhaka Airport Road is associated with the legend of a White Lady ghost supposedly seen by drivers.
 Dhaka Golf Heights, Banani, Dhaka: Claims include feelings of fear while walking past grave sites at night.
 Under-construction apartment in Old DOHS, Banani, Dhaka: One group of ghost hunters claim to have seen devil-worshipping signs written on walls at construction sites in Old DOHS Banani.
 Shahidullah Hall Pond, Dhaka: According to campus rumor, the pond adjoining Shahidullah Hall at Dhaka University campus is believed to be haunted.
 Farmhouse in Narsingdi: According to one local ghost hunting group, the house is haunted by the figure of a woman with climbing a tree.
 Farmhouse in Comilla: According to one ghost hunting group, a farmhouse in Comilla is reported to be haunted.

West Bengal, India 

 Rabindra Sarobar metro station
 Royal Calcutta Turf Club
 National Library of Kolkata
 Nimtala crematorium, Kolkata: According to legend, this site in central Kolkata is haunted by the ghosts of those who were cremated there.
 Putulbari or the House of Dolls, Kolkata: According to believers, the site is haunted by the souls of the dead.
 Hastings House, Alipore, Kolkata: According to legend, students have seen ghosts on the grounds.
 Writers' Building, Kolkata: According to legend, this residence of junior servants and administrative staff is haunted.
 Mullick Ghat and Zanana Bathing Ghat The Ganges - Under Howrah Bridge, Kolkata: Believers claim that many spirits wander the sacred river.

In popular culture
Ghosts, other similar supernatural entities, as well as tales of paranormal powers (such as clairvoyance, psychic phenomenon etc.) are plots for many short stories and novels in modern-day Bengali literature. Some classic literature and folk-lore are also based on such plots. The number of Bengali films of this genre are small in number compared to the western world. Multiple radio and TV programs also feature stories of people's paranormal experiences. Common people of both Bangladesh and West Bengal love the supernatural thrills, and the personal stories of people's paranormal experiences are hot topics for gossip, rumours and hangout discussions among friends and family.

Literature 

Literary works involving ghostly/demonic beings is one of the most popular genres in Bengali literature. In the early days, ghosts were the only ingredients of Bengali folk-tales and fairy-tales. Lal Behari Dey  collected many folk-tales of Bengal, and translated them in English. His book called Folk-Tales of Bengal, first published in 1883, features many amazing folk-tales associated with ghostly and supernatural beings.

Thakurmar Jhuli is the most classic collection of Bengali children's folk-tales and fairy-tales, which was compiled by Dakshinaranjan Mitra Majumder in 1907. There we can find many different categories of supernatural entities (such as Rakkhosh) featuring in different stories. Other such story collection from the same author are Thakurdadar Jhuli (1909), Thandidir Tholay (1909) and, Dadamoshayer Tholay (1913).

Many Bengali writers have practiced the genre of supernatural/horror in their short stories, novels, and others forms of literary works. Some are mentioned below:

 Bibhutibhushan Bandyopadhyay: Although known for his social novels set in rural Bengal, such as Pather Panchali, Adarsha Hindu Hotel, and Aranyak, this acclaimed writer also wrote some excellent short-stories involving the supernatural, such as Medal, Rankini Devir Khorgo, Maya, Obhisapto, Chele-dhora, Kashi kobirajer Golpo, Bhoitik Palonko, Kobirajer Bipod, Ashoriri, and the first two short stories featuring Taranath Tantrik, etc. Taranath Tantrik is a classic character in Bengali literature when it comes to supernatural and paranormal stories. Taranath Tantrik is a mystic figure and practitioner of the occult. He is an astrologer by profession, and had many encounters with the supernatural in his extensive travels throughout the towns and villages of Bengal. He shares these experiences with a few friends in his Mott lane house over cups of tea and cigarettes.
 Hemendra Kumar Roy: Hemendra Kumar Roy is credited for introducing vampire to Bengali literature. 
 Humayun Ahmed: Humayun Ahmed, arguably the most popular writer in post-liberation Bangladesh, wrote many stories and novels involving ghosts and the paranormal. His famous character Misir Ali is depicted as a part-time professor of Parapsychology, who also solve baffling cases associated with the paranormal. Some of Humayun Ahmed's novels feature Himu, who is depicted to have supernatural abilities, is haunted by post-mortal presence of his father who guides him to follow the way to become a modern-day saint. Humayun has also written many ghost stories, both for adult and children.
 Ishwar Chandra Vidyasagar: This famous writer wrote the free adopted Bengali translation of 11th century Sanskrit horror stories/tales collection within one frame story called Betaal Panchabinsati (meaning "Twenty-five [Tales] of the Phantom") in 1847. The hero of this series is King Vikramaditya, the legendary emperor of Ujjain, India. King  faces many difficulties in bringing the Betaal (a demonic being) to the tantric. Each time the king tries to capture the Betaal, it tells a story that ends with a riddle. If the king cannot answer the question correctly, the phantom consents to remain in captivity. If the king knows the answer but still keeps quiet, then his head shall burst into thousand pieces. And if King Vikram answers the question correctly, the phantom would escape and return to his tree. He knows the answer to every question; therefore the cycle of catching and releasing the phantom continues twenty-four times till the last question puzzles the king.
 Leela Majumdar: Leela Majumdar wrote many ghost stories for children. Her ghost story collection features in her book Sob Bhuture.
 Manik Bandopadhyay: This literary legend of classic Bengali novels has also written many short-stories among which a few are horror stories, such as Holudpora, Chobir Bhoot etc.
 Manoj Basu: Well known for his novel Nishikutumbo, prolific writer and poet Manoj Basu also wrote several classic ghost stories such as Jamai, Paatal-konna, Lal Chul, etc.
 Muhammed Zafar Iqbal: Although well known for his science fiction novels, he has also written a few novels of the supernatural/horror genre, such as Pret (1983), Pishachini (1992), Nishikonna (2003), Chayalin (2006), O (2008), and Danob (2009).
 Parashuram (Rajshekhar Basu) is the writer of the ghost story Bhushundir Mathe which is a comedy in the mould of horror. Parashuram wrote many other ghost stories like Mahesher Mahajatra which also impart an undertone of humor.
 Rabindranath Tagore: Nobel Laureate poet and writer Rabindranath also authored some short ghost stories like Konkal, Monihara, Mastermoshay, Nishithe, Khudhito Pashan etc., which are considered classics of this genre.
Sailajananda Mukhopadhyay: This noted Bengali novelist wrote a few horror short-stories such as Namaskar, Ke Tumi, etc.
Sasthipada Chattopadhyay: He wrote detective fiction, adventure stories, and horror stories for children and young adults. His ghost stories are collected in the book - Ponchasti Bhuter Golpo (2001), and Aro Ponchasti Bhuter Golpo (2015).
Satyajit Ray: Satyajit Ray, the famous Indian film maker, was quite popular in Bengal for his short stories. His favorite genres were fantasy and supernatural stories. His stories featuring Tarini Khuro, who is an aged bachelor, tells interesting stories based on his weird experiences, and many of these stories border on being horror or spooky, while some of the stories depict the smartness and quick wit of Tarini Khuro. Satyajit Ray's one of the most famous character is Professor Shonku, and some stories featuring Professor Shonku are also based on paranormal or supernatural mysteries such as Professor Shonku o Bhoot.
Sharadindu Bandyopadhyay: Another notable writer, predominantly famous for his detective series featuring Byomkesh Bakshi, has also authored a series called Baroda series. Baroda is a Bengali guy who is very much interested in the paranormal and likes to share his adventures and experiences of supernatural incidents with his friends. Sharadindu has also written some ghost stories such as Kamini, Dehantor, Bhoot Bhabishyat etc.
Shirshendu Mukhopadhyay: This exceedingly famous writer has also authored some humorous ghost stories. The specialty of his ghost stories is that his ghosts are innocent, kind and funny characters who always help the poor and needy, and punish the wicked person. Goshaibaganer Bhoot (The Ghost of Gosain Bagan) is one of his famous children's fiction, which was later adopted as a film in 2011. Popular Bengali film Goynar Baksho (2013) and Chhayamoy (2013) was also adapted from his novels. His ghostly short-story collection is featured in his book, Bhoutik Golposhomogro.
Sukumar Ray: This acclaimed writer has written some humorous literary pieces (e.g. short stories, humorous poetry) for children featuring weird and fictitious paranormal/hybrid animals, and even ghosts.
 Sunil Gangopadhyay: Famous for his modern-day classic novels, this famous writer has also written some ghost stories for children. His book Rahashamaya Bhuter Galpa features some of his ghostly short stories.
 Syed Mujtaba Ali: This acclaimed writer brought ghostly flavour in his novel Abishwasyo.
 Syed Mustafa Siraj: Basically known for his famous detective series featuring Colonel Niladri Sarkar. Siraj is also the creator of a series involving paranormal, featuring Murari Babu. Murari Babu is depicted as an innocent and nervous person living in Kolkata city, and his hobby is to collect old furniture from antique shops. Yet, his hobby always finds a way to get him into troubles relating to the paranormal. Siraj's horror short stories collection is featured in his book Bhoutik Golposhomogro.
 Taradas Bandyopadhyay: Taradas Bandyopadhyay's father, the legendary literati Bibhutibhushan Bandyopadhyay created the character 'Taranath Tantrik', but he wrote only two short stories featuring this character. Rest of the stories featuring Taranath Tantrik is written by Taradas Bandyopadhyay in two acclaimed books called - Taranath Tantrik (1985), and Olatchokro (2003).
Tarasankar Bandyopadhyay: Leading novelist Tarasankar also wrote a few horror short-stories such as Daaini, Bhulor Chholona, etc.
 Troilokyanath Mukhopadhyay: He used ghosts in a humorous and satirical way in his novels and stories; and created a new genre in Bengali literature, which was pioneering, and is still followed today by many Bengali writers. Bhoot O Manush, Nayanchandrer Bebsha, Lullu, Damru Charit, Kankaboti are few of his classics.
 Upendra Kishore Roychowdhury: He is one of the most talented author of children's literature of his time, and also noted for his ghost stories where the ghosts are harmless, fun-loving, and benevolent entities. Goopy Gyne Bagha Byne, Jola O Saat Bhoot, etc. are his famous stories involving ghosts.

Other than the writers mentioned above, many other prominent writers of Bengal have also written short-stories involving ghosts and the supernatural, such as Provatkumar Mukhopadhyay, Achintya Kumar Sengupta, Satinath Bhaduri, Buddhadeb Bosu and so on. However, at the present day, some young Bengali horror story writers are being somewhat influenced by the western horror literature, and their writings thus lack the originality of the classic Bengali horror literature and ghost stories.

Cinema 
Classic Bengali films with horror/supernatural plot are only a handful. Kankal (1950), Hanabari (1952), Monihara of the Teen Kanya movie anthology (1961) Kuheli (1971), were quite popular horror/supernatural thriller flick in the era of Bengali black and white movies.

The are only a few modern Bangladeshi horror movies and most of these movies can be typically categorized as low-budget horror-comedy. Few such examples are Rokto Pipasha (2007), Daini Buri (2008) and, Sedin Brishti Chilo (2014). Some Bangladeshi movies involving supernatural theme are stories about shapeshifting snakes or Ichchhadhari Nag that can take human form. Examples of such movies are Kal Naginir Prem, Bishakto Nagin, Bishe Bhora Nagin (1999), Sathi Hara Nagin (2011) etc.

In many Bengali films, ghosts are depicted in a lightly comical mood and sometimes in a friendly way. One of the examples is Goopy Gyne Bagha Byne (1969) as mentioned earlier is adopted from the story of Upendra Kishore Roychowdhury and directed by Satyajit Ray. In this film the King of Ghosts gives three boons to 'Goopy' and 'Bagha', the two  poor village boys who aspired to become a singer and drummer respectively. With the help of those boons they did many amazing adventures. The film is the first film of the Goopy Gyne Bagha Byne series, followed by a couple of sequels - Hirak Rajar Deshe was released in 1980; and Goopy Bagha Phire Elo, written by Ray, but directed by his son Sandip Ray, was released in 1992.

Nishi Trishna (1989), directed by Parimal Bhattacharya was the first Bengali vampire movie, starring Shekhar Chatterjee, Prasenjit Chatterjee and Moon Moon Sen. In this movie, some friends plan to visit the infamous Garchampa Palace which had a bad reputation for demonic blood-sucking beings that were terrorising the locality. They ultimately solve the mystery, and kill the vampire and his mentor.

Putuler Protisodh (1998), directed by Rabi Kinagi, was also based on the supernatural. The movie's story revolves around a girl named Bini who was married to Avinash. She falls prey in the hands of her in-laws who ultimately murdered her. The soul of Bini enters her doll to take revenge. She kills her mother-in-law, father-in-law and her maternal uncle one by one, and finally wants to kill her husband. But Avinash's second wife Laxmi was able to free Bini's soul from the doll.

Jekhane Bhooter Bhoy (2012), directed by Sandip Ray, is a movie based on three classic Bengali ghost stories. The stories are Satyajit Ray's Anath Babur Bhoy, Brown Saheber Bari and, Sharadindu Bandyopadhyay's Bhoot Bhabishyat.

Probably the most well-known film of horror genre in recent times is Bhooter Bhabishyat (2012), directed by Anik Dutta. It tells the story of a haunted mansion 'Choudhury Palace', where ghosts from different ethnic backgrounds and eras reside (a Bengali zamindar of 18th century, an actress of the 1930s, a modern rockstar, a soldier of Indian Army who died in Kargil, etc.). The film with its simple but humorous story went on to become a massive blockbuster of 2012.

Goynar Baksho (2013) is another popular film involving the supernatural. The film, directed by Aparna Sen, is an adaptation of Shirshendu Mukhopadhyay's famous tale of 3 generations of women & their changing position in society as seen in relation to a box of jewels, handed down from one generation to the next.

Chhayamoy (2013) is another notable horror movie based on Shirshendu Mukhopadhyay's novel of the same name. The story is about Indrajit, a UK based scholar. While working to preserve historical documents he find a parchment from which he learns about treasures hidden in an old palace in Simulgarh, a village of West Bengal. Indrajit comes to the village, finds out the treasure, but, a local goon Gagan Sapui accuses him of robbery, beats him up and expels him out of the village. Sapui wants to melt those coins to make new jewellery. After being beaten up, Indrajit goes to forest near the village where he meets Chhayamoy, a benevolent ghost. After listening the incidence from Indrajit, Chhayamoy decides to teach Gagan a lesson.

Radio, television and online streaming platforms 

A live radio program called Bhoot FM is being aired by Bangladeshi radio channel Radio Foorti 88.0 FM at 12:00 am, every Friday night. The program is being aired since 13 August 2010; and is hosted by RJ Russell. In this program, people from all over Bangladesh come and share their real-life experiences associated with ghosts, demons, jinns and the paranormal/supernatural. The Bengali community from all over the world also share their supernatural experiences by sending audio clips and email that is played/read in this program. Other such radio program was Dor, aired by ABC Radio 89.2 FM. Dor was recorded from different haunted places of Bangladesh, and is hosted by RJ Kebria along with RJ Suman and tarot card reader Radbi Reza. Similar kind of programs were also aired on TV channels, such as Moddhorater Train (meaning 'Midnight Train') by Maasranga Television.

There are some radio programs which feature recitation of horror stories written by acclaimed writers. Such radio program is Sunday Suspense by Radio Mirchi, aired from Kolkata, which features recitation of horror stories, as well as stories of other genres such as detective fiction, fantasy, and Sci-fi, etc. Similar such radio program is Kuasha, aired by ABC Radio 89.2 FM from Bangladesh, which features horror stories written by famous writers, and also stories sent by listeners of the program.

Pett Kata Shaw, a 2021 anthology series released on Chorki (OTT), features the modern revival of the mysterious and lurid folklores of Mechho Bhoot, Jinn, Kanabhulo and  Nishi.

See also 
 Culture of Bengal
 List of ghosts

References

External links 
 Bhoot FM Recorded Episodes: Real life paranormal experiences of Bangali people
 Thakurmar Jhuli (1907) by Dakshinaranjan Mitra Majumder
 Folk-Tales of Bengal (1883) by Rev. Lal Behari Dey
 Amar Priyo Bhoutik Golpo (1997) by Humayun Ahmed
 Odbhut Joto Bhooter Golpo by Gaurango Proshad Basu

Bengali
Bengali culture
Superstitions of India
Bangladeshi legendary creatures
Indian legendary creatures